The City of Whittlesea is a local government area located in the outer northern suburbs of Melbourne, the state capital of Victoria, Australia.

History

What became the City of Whittlesea had its origins in two separate roads districts (an early, single-purpose form of local government). The first, Whittlesea Roads District, was incorporated on 12 December 1862.  On 1 January 1875 it was amalgamated with the Merriang riding of the Shire of Darebin to create the Shire of Whittlesea. The second, Epping Roads District, was incorporated on 21 July 1870. It was then enlarged on 11 January 1859 and then again on 25 July 1864 to cover the Northcote area. On 26 September 1870 it was merged with Merriang Roads District, Upper Plenty Roads District and Woodstock Roads District to form the Shire of Darebin. Part of the Shire of Derebin was then excised to create the Shire of Jika in 1872, and, as stated above, Merriang riding was merged with the Whittlesea Roads District to form the Shire of Whittlesea in 1875. The Shire of Darebin was renamed the Shire of Epping on 22 March 1894. On 1 October 1915, the Shire of Epping was absorbed by the Shire of Whittlesea as part of a restructuring of local government outside the Melbourne metropolitan area in Victoria.

On 31 May 1955, parts of the City of Broadmeadows were annexed to Shire of Whittlesea and the neighbouring Shire of Bulla. The population grew rapidly as urbanisation reached the southern edge of the shire. In 1979 an internal redistribution took place creating the four ridings based on population and on 30 March 1988 it was proclaimed by the Governor of Victoria as a City, effective from 15 April of that year.

On 15 December 1994, massive local government reform once again affected Whittlesea's boundaries, although unlike most, the City survived largely intact. 18% of its land area was ceded to entities created in 1994 – the Doreen and Arthurs Creek districts were lost to the new Shire of Nillumbik, while Kinglake West went to Shire of Murrindindi and Somerton to the City of Hume.

Until April 1993, the council met at the Shire Office at High Street and Houston Street, Epping, next to the primary school. In that month, it moved to its present headquarters in Ferres Boulevard, South Morang. The original premises in Epping is now a council depot.

The City of Whittlesea is a culturally diverse community with the 2011 Census recording that 38.3% of residents were born overseas.

Whittlesea 2040 is a long term vision for the City and guides the Council's work and future partnerships with the community and others.

History of the main suburbs

Bundoora

The traditional owners of the land now known as Bundoora were probably the Wurundjeri-willam clan. Bundoora was named after Keelbundoora, which was the name of the parish (land) where Bundoora exists today. Keelbundoora was also the name of the young boy present at the signing of the Batman treaty, a historic land agreement made by European settler, John Batman with the Aboriginal people of Melbourne in 1835. The treaty was later ruled invalid by the government of the day. Only a small part of Bundoora is within the City of Whittlesea boundary, the rest of the suburb is served by Darebin City Council and Banyule City Council.

Lalor

Lalor was established in 1947. Lalor was originally the home of a low-cost housing project that provided houses for ex-servicemen returning from World War II. The first primary school opened in 1954.

Thomastown

Legend has it that Thomastown was named after a local settler called Thomas who started a popular market garden in 1848. It was more than likely named after Thomastown in Ireland, a parish and market town in the County of Kilkenny, or a station on the Waterford to Kilkenny Junction railway. Thomastown East Primary school was opened in 1961.

Epping

Epping was named after the Epping Forest in Essex, England in 1853. The first hotel opened the same year. The first Catholic school was opened in 1844.

South Morang

South Morang is named after the Parish (or area) of Morang where the suburb exists today. The first primary school in South Morang was built in 1877 and the suburb has two major parks, Hawkstowe and Plenty Gorge Parklands. The former Whittlesea railway line used to run through South Morang, as in many other suburbs in the municipality.

Whittlesea

Whittlesea, as the township came to be called, was named after Whittlesey in England. Close to 1889 a railway from Whittlesea to Melbourne was established to transport goods produced in the region to Melbourne. The railway closed in 1959.

Mill Park

Mill Park was named after Henry "Money" Miller who bred racehorses and conducted a range of dairy and grazing activities at his property named The Findon Hounds and the Findon Harriers Hunt Club until 1930. Residential development began in Mill Park in the 1970s.

Mernda

This area has grown from a population of 1316 in 2001 to 3430 in 2006, and is anticipated to grow to around 40,000 people at full development. The name Mernda means "young girl" in the local Wurundjeri Aboriginal language. When Mernda was named in 1913 the township consisted of a school, a Methodist church, a store and a railway station. In the early 1900s there were many dairy farms in Mernda that supplied milk to Melbourne.

Wards

Historically, Shire of Whittlesea was divided into four ridings, each electing three councillors. When it became a City in 1988, these were converted into wards:

 Centre Ward (formerly Yan Yean Riding, then Central Riding)
 East Ward (formerly Morang Riding, then South East Riding)
 West Ward (formerly Thomastown Riding, then South West Riding)
 North Ward (formerly Whittlesea Riding, then North Riding)

Over a number of elections there have been changes to the number of wards and councillors. In 1994 Whittlesea was re-subdivided into nine wards, each with one councillor. At the 2005 election the Victorian Electoral Commission reviewed the ward boundaries and composition. This resulted in three wards, each electing three councillors.

At the 2012 General Election the three wards were retained, however changes were made to ward boundaries to reflect the municipality's growing population. In total eleven councillors were elected:
 North Ward (3 councillors)
 South-East Ward (4 councillors)
 South-West Ward (4 councillors)

Townships and localities
The 2021 census, the city had a population of 229,396 up from 197,491 in the 2016 census

^ - Territory divided with another LGA

Population

Councillors
After a three-month investigation into administrative and governing issues, on 20 March 2020 the Victorian state government dismissed Whittlesea council and replaced them with three administrators who will govern for four years.

The next elections will not take place till October 2024. The last election, in October 2016, was a general election for the Whittlesea City Council conducted by the Victorian Electoral Commission.

Council is currently led by Chair Administrator Lydia Wilson, supported by Administrators Peita Duncan and Chris Eddy.

Previous mayors

There have been 21 mayors of Whittlesea since 1997. The mayor is elected yearly from amongst the elected councillors to serve as leader of the council.

References

Further reading 
 Jones, Michael Nature's Plenty: a history of the City of Whittlesea, Sydney, N.S.W. Allen & Unwin, 1992

External links
 

Knowledge Whittlesea
Link to Land Victoria interactive maps
Whittlesea information web site
Yarra Plenty Regional Library

Local government areas of Melbourne
Greater Melbourne (region)
 
1862 establishments in Australia
Hume Highway